Wreck & Ruin is the second collaboration album between the Australian country singer Kasey Chambers and the Australian singer Shane Nicholson, released by Liberation Music in Australia on 7 September 2012 (see 2012 in music).

Upon release, Nicholson said "I don't want it to sound flippant, but it quite easy to write. It formed itself quite easily. We were just there, like we were hanging around while the songs were being written. When I listen to the album it sounds easy."

In October 2013, the album won Best Country Album at the 2013 ARIA Awards. It was also nominated for the Best Cover Art, but lost to Ice on the Dune.

Reception

Mark Deming of AllMusic gave the album a positive review, saying; "The 13 songs they wrote for this project are sublime, hitting their target with impressive skill. Whether they're trying to generate laughter, menace, or a pull on the heartstrings. Kasey Chambers and Shane Nicholson are two of the finest natural talents in country and folk music today need only listen to this to be convinced".

Sienna Cronin from Daily Mercury said "There's an easy feeling about Wreck & Ruin, the new album from Kasey Chambers and Shane Nicholson. It could be the husband-and-wife duo's natural chemistry, their individual talents as songwriters or their wholesome, family approach to life in the music industry - or a combination of all three."

Track listing

Personnel
Jeb Cardwell – banjo, resonator guitar (dobro), acoustic guitar, backing vocals
James Gillard – bass (upright), electric bass, backing vocals
Steve Fearnley – drums, percussion, backing vocals
John Bedggood – fiddle, mandolin, backing vocals
Shane Nicholson – vocals, acoustic guitar, electric guitar, mandolin, accordion, harmonium, harmonica, percussion
Kasey Chambers – vocals, banjo
Jeff McCormack – mastering
Andrew Cooney – photography (band)
Helen Clemens – photography (Kasey and Shane)

Charts

Weekly charts

Year-end charts

References

2012 albums
ARIA Award-winning albums
Kasey Chambers albums
Shane Nicholson (singer) albums
Collaborative albums
Albums produced by Shane Nicholson (singer)